Eurofighter Jagdflugzeug GmbH (English: Eurofighter fighter aircraft GmbH) is a multinational company that coordinates the design, production and upgrade of the Eurofighter Typhoon, this includes incorporating the jet engines designed and manufactured by EuroJet Turbo GmbH.

Founded in 1986, it has its head office in Hallbergmoos, Bavaria, Germany. The company is owned by the major aerospace companies of the four Eurofighter partner nations:

 46%: Airbus Defence and Space (then known as EADS) (France, Germany and Spain)
 33%: BAE Systems Military Air & Information (United Kingdom)
 21%: Leonardo (Italy)

Eurofighter GmbH's customer is the NATO Eurofighter and Tornado Management Agency (NETMA), operating on behalf of the partner nations. This collaborative management model follows that of the Tornado programme closely. In that case Panavia Aircraft GmbH was responsible for delivering the weapon system, and the UK registered Turbo-Union Ltd. was responsible for the propulsion system.

History
The first production contract was signed on 30 January 1998 between Eurofighter GmbH, Eurojet and NETMA. The procurement totals were as follows: the UK 232, Germany 180, Italy 121, and Spain 87. Production was again allotted according to procurement: BAe (37.42%), DASA (29.03%), Aeritalia (19.52%), and CASA (14.03%). However, during 1995, concerns over workshare, which was based on the number of units intended to be ordered by each contributing nation, were voiced, as all nations involved has opted to reduce their orders following the end of the Cold War and the enactment of the Peace Dividend. The UK cut its orders from 250 to 232, Germany from 250 to 140, Italy from 165 to 121 and Spain from 100 to 87. According to these order levels the workshare split should have been 39/24/22/15 UK/Germany/Italy/Spain, however Germany was unwilling to give up such a large amount of work. In January 1996, after much negotiation between German and UK partners, a compromise was reached whereby Germany would purchase another 40 aircraft. The workshare split was 43% for EADS MAS in Germany and Spain; 37.5% BAE Systems in the UK; and 19.5% for Alenia in Italy.

The maiden flight of the Eurofighter prototype took place in Bavaria on 27 March 1994, flown by DASA chief test pilot Peter Weger. On 9December 2004, Eurofighter Typhoon IPA4 began three months of Cold Environmental Trials (CET) at the Vidsel Air Base in Sweden, the purpose of which was to verify the operational behaviour of the aircraft and its systems in temperatures between −25 and 31 °C. The maiden flight of Instrumented Production Aircraft7 (IPA7), the first fully equipped Tranche2 aircraft, took place from EADS' Manching airfield on 16 January 2008.

In September 1998, contracts were signed for production of 148 Tranche1 aircraft and procurement of long lead-time items for Tranche2 aircraft. In March 2008, the final aircraft out of Tranche1 was delivered to the German Air Force, with all successive deliveries being at the Tranche2 standard. On 21 October 2008, the first two of 91 Tranche2 aircraft, ordered four years before, were delivered to RAF Coningsby.

In October 2008, the Eurofighter nations were considering splitting the 236-fighter Tranche3 into two parts. In June 2009, RAF Air Chief Marshal Sir Glenn Torpy suggested that the RAF fleet could be 123 jets, instead of the 232 previously planned. In spite of this reduced requirement, on 14 May 2009 British Prime Minister Gordon Brown confirmed the UK would move ahead with the third batch purchase. A contract for the first part, Tranche 3A, was signed during July 2009 for 112 aircraft split across the four partner nations, including 40 aircraft for the UK, 31 for Germany, 21 for Italy and 20 for Spain. These 40 aircraft were said to have fully covered the UK's obligations in the project due to cost overruns. In February 2019, Germany ordered 33 further Typhoons to replace ageing Tranche1 aircraft.

The Eurofighter Typhoon is unique in modern combat aircraft in that there are four separate assembly lines. Each partner company assembles its own national aircraft, but builds the same parts for all aircraft (including exports); Premium AEROTEC (main centre fuselage), EADS CASA (right wing, leading edge slats), BAE Systems (front fuselage (including foreplanes), canopy, dorsal spine, tail fin, inboard flaperons, rear fuselage section) and Leonardo (left wing, outboard flaperons, rear fuselage sections).

Production is divided into three tranches (see table below). Tranches are a production/funding distinction, and do not imply an incremental increase in capability with each tranche. Tranche3 are based on late Tranche2 aircraft with improvements added. Tranche3 was split into A and B parts. Tranches were further divided up into production standard/capability blocks and funding/procurement batches, though these did not coincide, and are not the same thing; e.g., the Eurofighter designated FGR4 by the RAF is a Tranche 1, block 5. Batch1 covered block 1, but batch2 covered blocks 2, 2B and 5. On 25 May 2011 the 100th production aircraft, ZK315, rolled off the production line at Warton.

References

Notes

Citations

External links

Eurofighter website (operated by Eurofighter Jagdflugzeug GmbH)

Multinational aircraft manufacturers
BAE Systems joint ventures
Airbus joint ventures
Defence companies of Germany
Aircraft manufacturers of Germany
Eurofighter Typhoon